Yarra Glen is a major grade separated arterial road in Canberra. It links at its northern end to Adelaide Avenue, and at its southern end to Melrose Drive and Yamba Drive via a large roundabout. It was designed to have no traffic lights nor cross roads on it.

Route description
Yarra Glen continues from the western end of Adelaide Avenue, at Novar Street interchange. As the road begins to curve towards the south ramps are provided to Cotter Road, the road continues in a gradual curve before straightening when heading roughly north-south. Another interchange is provided halfway along this section to Carruthers Street, and the roadway terminates at a large roundabout at the northern end of Woden Town Centre, which interfaces with the northern ends of Melrose Drive and Yamba Drive.

History
The National Capital Development Commission unveiled its plans for Yarra Glen, which was then known as the Woden Parkway, on 22 January 1965. It was originally proposed to continue north through  to meet with a then unbuilt extension what is now part of Parkes Way on the northern side of Lake Burley Griffin, this would have included a major bridge across the lake twice the length of the Commonwealth Avenue bridge. And also to have extended further south into the Woden Valley, connecting via a number of interchanges to collector roads. and each carriageway was to have 2 or 3 lanes depending on location, which provision for a fourth.

The contract to build Stage 1 of the envisaged Woden Parkway, which stretched from Adelaide Avenue to the Carruthers Street interchange, was awarded to Leighton Contractors in May 1966. By this stage, plans required two lanes per carriageway to be built instead, with provision for a third. The construction of the roadway required partial closure of Adelaide Avenue, with traffic diverted through existing thoroughfares in nearby suburbs.

The second stage of what was now known as Yarra Glen, which stretched from Carruthers Street interchange to Melrose Drive was also built by Leighton Contractors, and completed was opened on 21 December 1967.

The final name of Yarra Glen is based upon an early homestead in the area which bore the same name. It was gazetted on 29 September 1966. A spokesman for the Department of the Interior said that the usual roadway suffixes weren't used as the name sounded better without them.

Currently, Yarra Glen has not been extended beyond the second stage of the originally envisaged Woden Parkway, with the at-grade Callam Street and Athllon Drive taking the place of further grade-separated construction to the south, neither road connects directly to Yarra Glen. Plans were abandoned for an extension to the north with the nearby Tuggeranong Parkway taking over the function of the originally proposed northern extension, but instead located to the west of Lake Burley Griffin. The roadway still has 2 standard lanes per carriageway, though an additional bus lane has been added along most of the northbound extension.

Junctions

See also

References

Transport in Canberra
Highways in the Australian Capital Territory